Atsushi Kizuka (木塚 敦志, born July 19, 1977) is a former Nippon Professional Baseball pitcher.

External links

1977 births
Living people
Baseball people from Saitama Prefecture
Meiji University alumni
Japanese baseball players
Nippon Professional Baseball pitchers
Yokohama BayStars players
Japanese baseball coaches
Nippon Professional Baseball coaches